Events in the year 1997 in Gabon.

Incumbents 

 President: Omar Bongo Ondimba
 Prime Minister: Paulin Obame-Nguema

Events 

 The Synod of the Evangelical Church of Gabon was formed.

Deaths

References 

 
1990s in Gabon
Years of the 20th century in Gabon
Gabon